Tron is a 1982 science fiction film produced by Walt Disney Productions.

Tron may also refer to:

Tron franchise
 Tron (franchise), an American science fiction media franchise begun with the 1982 film Tron

Films
 Tron: Legacy, a 2010 science fiction film sequel

Television
 Tron: Uprising, a 2012 animated television series set between Tron and Tron: Legacy

Soundtracks
 Tron (soundtrack), the soundtrack album for the 1982 film
 Tron: Legacy (soundtrack), the soundtrack album for the 2010 film

Comics
 Tron: The Ghost in the Machine (2006–2008), a six-issue series continuing the storyline of the film Tron and the video game Tron 2.0
 Tron: Betrayal (2010), a two-issue series serving as the official prequel to the Tron: Legacy film

Games
 Tron (video game), an arcade game based on the 1982 film
 Discs of Tron, a second arcade game based on the 1982 film
 Tron 2.0, a 2003 video game sequel
 Tron Evolution: Battle Grids, a video game based on the 2010 Tron: Legacy film
 Tron: Evolution, a 2010 video game that serves as a prequel to the Tron: Legacy film

Computing
 TRON (encoding), a multi-byte character encoding
 TRON command, a debugging command in the BASIC programming language, an abbreviation of TRace ON
 TRON project, a real-time operating system kernel project by Ken Sakamura
 Tron, a block cellular automaton rule
 Tron (hacker), a German computer hacker (1972 – 1998)
 TRON (cryptocurrency), a cryptocurrency founded in 2017

Other uses
 Tron (Scotland), a public weighing balance and hence standard weights and measures in the Burghs of medieval Scotland
 Tron Kirk, a church built at the tron in Edinburgh, Scotland
 Trongate, a street in Glasgow, Scotland 
 Tron Theatre, a theatre, formerly kirk, in the Glasgow Trongate 
 St George's Tron Church, a Church of Scotland church in Glasgow
 The Tron Church at Kelvingrove, an evangelical Presbyterian church in Glasgow
 Tron family, a Venetian noble family
 Studio TRON, a comic book and animation studio created by manga artist Kia Asamiya
 "The Tron", a nickname of Hamilton, New Zealand
 The Trons, a self-playing robotic musical group from Hamilton, New Zealand

See also

 Electron (disambiguation)
 Elektron (disambiguation)
 Etron (disambiguation), including e-tron
 Thon (disambiguation)
 Throne (disambiguation)
 Ton (disambiguation)
 Toon (disambiguation)